Qiqihar station is a railway station of the Harbin–Qiqihar intercity railway, Siping-Qiqihar Railway and Qiqihar–Bei'an Railway. The station is located in the town of Qiqihar, Heilongjiang, China.

See also
 Qiqihar South railway station

References

Railway stations in Heilongjiang
Stations on the Harbin–Manzhouli Railway
Stations on the Qiqihar–Bei'an railway
Railway stations in China opened in 1909